Loira is a locality and small rural community in the local government area of West Tamar, in the Western Tamar Valley region of Tasmania. The Supply River forms the southern and part of the eastern boundaries. The 2016 census determined a population of 160 for the state suburb of Loira.

History
Originally known as “Port Station”, the locality name is derived from an Aboriginal word meaning “charcoal reduced to powder”.

Road infrastructure
The C729 route (Motor Road) intersects with the West Tamar Highway, which passes through the locality from south-east to north-west. It runs north-east through the locality to Deviot.

References

Localities of West Tamar Council
Towns in Tasmania